Robert Bruce is an 1846 pastiche opera in three acts, with music by Gioachino Rossini and Louis Niedermeyer to a French-language libretto by Alphonse Royer and Gustave Vaëz. The plot concerns the defeat of the forces of Edward II of England by Robert the Bruce, King of Scots, and is adapted from Walter Scott's History of Scotland. The music was stitched together by Niedermeyer, with the composer's permission, with pieces from La donna del lago, Zelmira, and other Rossini operas. The work was premiered on 30 December 1846, by the Paris Opera at the Salle Le Peletier. The audience may not have noticed, but the orchestra included for the first time a recently invented instrument, which later came to be known as the saxophone.

Background
After Rossini's arrival in Paris in 1843 for medical treatment, he was visited by Léon Pillet, the director of the Paris Opera. Pillet begged Rossini to compose a new work for the house. Rossini declined because of his poor health, but pointed out that his opera La donna del lago (1819), which he felt had never been performed adequately at the Théâtre Italien in Paris, would be "most suitable for the French stage, the one that more than the others, had need of your big choruses, your magnificent orchestra, your beautiful staging. ... Now that you have [Rosine] Stoltz at your disposal you would do well to profit by it." However, Pillet was reluctant to present a work which since 1824 in its Italian version was already well known to Parisian audiences.

Rossini went back to his home in Bologna, where in June 1846 he was again visited by Pillet, who was accompanied by librettist Gustave Vaëz, and Louis Niedermeyer. The result (which also involved Vaëz's regular collaborator Alphonse Royer as co-librettist) was Robert Bruce, an elaborate pasticcio, based on music not only from La donna del lago and Zelmira, but also from Bianca e Falliero, Torvaldo e Dorliska, Armida, Mosè in Egitto, and Maometto II. Niedermeyer apparently wrote the necessary recitatives.

Premiere

Rossini was clearly involved in the collaboration but did not attend the premiere in Paris. The production included a ballet with the dancers Lucien Petipa, Henri Desplaces, Adèle Dumilâtre, and Maria Jacob, and choreography by Joseph Mazilier. The décor was designed by Joseph Thierry (Act 1); Charles Cambon, Jules Diéterle, and Édouard Desplechin (Act 2); and René Philastre and Charles Cambon (Act 3). The costumes were designed by Paul Lormier. It was a moderate success, but the opera was the subject of much criticism from Hector Berlioz, among others.

Roles

Recordings

References

Notes

Citations

Works cited
 
 
 
 
 
  Reprint (1987): New York: Limelight. .

External links
 1847 French libretto at Google Books
 

Operas
1846 operas
French-language operas
Operas by Gioachino Rossini
Operas by Louis Niedermeyer
Operas set in Scotland
Robert the Bruce